Rear Admiral Philip Graham Sharp CB, DSC (1913–1988) is a former Royal Navy officer who served as Flag Officer Sea Training.

Naval career
Sharp joined the Royal Navy in 1939 and saw action in destroyers during the Second World War. He became Captain of the Fleet for the Home Fleet in November 1960, commanding officer of the aircraft carrier HMS Centaur in June 1962 and commanding officer of HMNB Portsmouth in June 1963. He went on to be Flag Officer Sea Training in April 1965 before retiring in July 1967.
 
Sharp was appointed a Companion of the Order of the Bath in the 1967 New Year Honours.

References

 

1913 births
1988 deaths
Royal Navy rear admirals
Companions of the Order of the Bath
Recipients of the Distinguished Service Cross (United Kingdom)